Historic St Barnabas Church and Cemetery is located in Tasmania, Australia. Built on a hill that sits above Half Moon Bay, it overlooks the shipping lines and sailing regattas on the Derwent River. St Barnabas is the parish church of the outer Hobart suburb of South Arm.

Early history

South Arm is located on a peninsula that is acknowledged as the traditional land of the Aboriginal Tasmanian Palawa people. The ancient middens in the area testify to their great affinity with the land.

Founding of British colony and land grants

Tasmania was founded by the British as a convict colony in 1788, and by 1804 land grants were given out to free settlers, convicts whose sentences were completed, and military personnel. The grants for Tasmania were managed from Sydney until just after Tasmania was separated from New South Wales in 1825.

Settlement of South Arm peninsula

William Gellibrand (1765–1840)

William Gellibrand arrived in Hobart from England in 1824 and was appointed a Justice of the Peace.  He received the first land grant of 2220 acres at Arm End along with ten convicts. He was known for the care and respect he gave his convict servants.
He provided them with a comfortable hut and clothing that did not distinguish them as prisoners. Thus he gave them a fresh start, giving them the opportunity to raise families and contribute to the founding of the farm community at South Arm.

William built a large home on the northern end of the South Arm peninsula known as "Arm End". It was constructed of convict-made bricks on a stone foundation. He planted mulberry, walnut, chestnut and plum trees. His grave vault is still to be found at the former location of Spit Farm.  As Attorney General of Tasmania,  he managed to reform the legal system in the colony.

Land leases

When his grandfather died in 1840 , George Henry Blake Gellibrand took over the land leases . In 1851 he offered land leases to Christopher Calvert , and also to other farmers as they moved into the area, and pardoned convicts, who were later able to purchase the farms they established. 
This important social change established a democratic way of life.

GHB Gellibrand built his home on the corner of Bezzants Rd, at the foot of the hill where St.Barnabas is situated today.  The Rev Joseph Tice Gellibrand conducted church services in the open air and when the small Schoolhouse was built in 1854 he held the services in the school.

Farmers and orchardists
Small as they were in numbers, the settlers of South Arm achieved much.
It was a period when many were trying to establish the farms and orchards throughout the district.
Life would have been hard as much of the peninsula was still heavily covered with trees that had to be cleared before crops could be sowed.

The Mercury reports from that time mention the names of well-known families that appear on several occasions, describing how the families lived and developed their farms to become the best on the peninsula,  Travel was by the waterways around South Arm and most farmers had a small boat to transport the produce to Hobart.

The produce was also sent to Hobart markets by barges, and the only means of getting the produce onto the barges was by punts, which needed to be taken out a considerable distance.
This caused several drownings and a request was made to build a pier. Some gravestones at St.Barnabas indicate these unfortunate untimely deaths.

These families still have some descendants living in the area. St.Barnabas was central in their lives. The South Arm community raised the money to build the church in 1893, and both the church and the Gellibrand Fellowship Hall have been in continuous use ever since.

Service at Musk Beach

On 17 December 1878, the Lord Bishop of Tasmania visited the Missionary Station of South Arm in the district of Clarence Plains for the purpose of holding a confirmation. On arriving at Musk Beach he was met by the Rev R. Wilson. The Mercury of the day discussed the lack of a clergyman in South Arm.

Building of St Barnabas

Initially burials of residents of South Arm were at Rokeby, across Ralphs Bay.
In about 1851 founding families had donated the land for the cemetery and land was provided for a church.

Fundraising to build the church commenced in 1891 and continued until 1893.
The Hobart Mercury of 17 September 1892 shows that the total amount collected from South Arm families who gave money to build the church was 272 pounds, 7 shillings, fourpence halfpenny.

Plan
The community banded together and came up with a plan to accomplish the work quickly. Following the construction of a stone house, now in Harmony Lane, there was no more stone available in the area. Money was raised for a ship to be chartered by the community to bring an entire cargo hull of strong Canadian pine to build the church and line the interior walls. The pine wood was hardwearing and some of the beams were 14 to 18 feet in length so they could build it quickly in the time they had. Some houses in the area are made from pine that was left over.

Dedication
The Mercury of 28 July 1892, Page 2 carried an article, "St Barnabas Church, South Arm Dedication Service":

Consecration
The Mercury of Thursday 6 April 1893 featured news of the consecration of St Barnabas:

Gellibrand Fellowship Hall

Centennial

Cemetery

Burials had been carried out long before the construction of the church from the date on the headstone of Elizabeth Alomes.

The earliest burial at St Barnabas cemetery took place in 1858. Joseph Willmore was a convict granted land at Muddy Plains where he then established a farm.
Blatherwick, Alomes and Musk family members were other early burials, and several others took place between 1865 and 1897.

War graves
There are several war graves dating from World War I and World War II.

In their honour, a commemorative Aleppo pine (Pinus halepensis) seedling from Gallipoli was planted, which has thrived at the northern corner of the cemetery.

References

Anglican churches in Tasmania
South Arm Peninsula